Buro Sadhu is an Indian Bengali psychological thriller film directed by VIK and produced by Wisemonk Creative in association with Abir Ghosh and Somnath Ghosh and co-produced by DNA Entertainment Networks. The film starring Ritwick Chakraborty, Chiranjeet Chakraborty, and Ishaa Saha follows the journey of the protagonist Abir, from boyhood to manhood, his disturbed family life and relationships during his journey from rags to riches. The film released in India on 1 November 2019

Cast
 Ritwick Chakraborty as Abir
 Chiranjeet Chakraborty
 Ishaa Saha as Sweta
 Dolon Roy
 Mishmee Das as Abir’s first girlfriend
 Debesh Chattopadhyay
 Barun Chakraborty
 Amit Saha

Release
The official motion poster was released by Webaqoof Music on 2 September 2019. The official trailer was released by Webaqoof Music on 23 September 2019.

Soundtrack

The soundtrack is composed by Pranjal Das and lyrics are also by him.

References

External links
 

Bengali-language Indian films
2019 films
Indian coming-of-age films
Indian psychological thriller films